The 1892 Lehigh football team was an American football team that represented Lehigh University as an independent during the 1892 college football season. In its first and only season under head coach John A. Hartwell, the team compiled a 3–6 record and was outscored by a total of 164 to 91.

Schedule

References

Lehigh
Lehigh Mountain Hawks football seasons
Lehigh football